Guelma Province is a province (wilaya) in eastern Algeria. Its namesake is its seat and most populous municipality: Guelma.

History
Its civilians suffered heavy casualties during the 1945 Sétif massacre by the French Army. The province itself was established in 1974. Before that, it was part of Annaba Province.

In 1984 El Taref Province and Souk Ahras Province were carved out of its territory.

Demographics
It has 429,998 inhabitants as of the 1998 census, one of the lower populations in the country, which gives it 39 seats in the APW, the province's assembly. Of these, 54.4% live in urban areas and 87% have access to safe drinking water, lower than the national average of 89%.  . Of the active population of the province, 23.3% work in agriculture, 17.9% in constructions, 9.9% in industry, and 48.9% in the services sector. 21.1% of the population is unemployed.]

Geography
Forests cover about 31% of the total area, which equals , composed mainly of Aleppo Pine, Algerian Oak and Cork Oak. Areas dedicated for future industrial development, called activity zones in Algeria cover .]

Administrative divisions
The province is divided into 10 districts (daïras), which are further divided into 34 communes or municipalities.

Districts

 Aïn Makhlouf
 Bouchegouf
 Guelaât Bou Sbaâ
 Guelma
 Hammam Debagh
 Hammam N'Bails
 Héliopolis
 Houari Boumédienne
 Khezaras
 Oued Zenati

Communes

 Aïn Ben Beida
 Houari Boumediene
 Aïn Larbi
 Aïn Makhlouf
 Aïn Reggada
 Aïn Sandel
 Belkheir
 Ben Djarah
 Beni Mezline
 Bordj Sabat
 Bou Hachana
 Bou Hamdane
 Bouati Mahmoud
 Boughouf
 Boumahra Ahmed
 Dahouara
 Djeballah Khemissi
 El Fedjoudj
 Guellat Bou Dbaa
 Guelma
 Hammam Debagh
 Hammam Nbail
 Héliopolis
 Kheraza
 Medjez Amar
 Medjez Sfa
 Nechmaya
 Oued Cheham
 Oued Fragha
 Oued Zenati
 Ras El Agba
 Roknia
 Salaoua Announa
 Tamlouka

Notable residents
 Houari Boumédienne, President of Algeria
 Saint Possidius, bishop of Calama (Guelma) (5th century)

See also

Khamissa — Ancient Roman ruins in province.

References

External links
 Official Tourism Office of Guelma Province website — ; ; ;  

 
Provinces of Algeria
 States and territories established in 1974